The 1669 Polish–Lithuanian royal election was an election to decide on the new candidate for the Polish–Lithuanian throne.

Background 
On 16 September 1668, King John II Casimir abdicated the Polish–Lithuanian throne. He left for France and joined the Jesuits where he became Abbot of Saint-Germain-des-Prés Abbey in Paris which resulted in the Polish–Lithuanian Commonwealth being left without a monarch, making it necessary for a free election.

History 
The pro-French faction, which was backed by Michal Prazmowski and Crown Hetman Jan Sobieski, was strong. During the Convocation, several Sejm members of the szlachta urged the election of a native Piast king instead. There were widespread rumors that supporters of foreign candidates had been bribed. Under the circumstances, the Bishop of Chełmno, Andrzej Olszowski, suggested that instead of a foreigner, a Pole should be elected. Olszowski suggested the candidacy of Michał Korybut Wiśniowiecki, who was the son of legendary Ruthenian magnate, Jeremi Wiśniowiecki. Michał Korybut was an exceptional individual, but the Szlachta who were afraid of growing French influences, decided to back him. Local sejmiks urged the nobility to come to Warsaw as pospolite ruszenie.

The free election, which took place in May and June 1669 in Wola, near Warsaw, is regarded as the epitome of szlachta anarchy (see Golden Liberty). After heated arguments on June 6, a crowd of nobility electors forced senators to void the candidacy of Louis, Grand Condé. Some senators tried to oppose, but most gave way to the threats and eventually supported the Bishop of Kujawy, Florian Czartoryski, who stated: “The voice of the people is the voice of God”.

On June 17, some districts of Warsaw burned in a fire and rumors soon spread that the fire was intentionally set. Szlachta surrounded the wooden shed in which the senators convened, accusing them of treason and conspiring with foreign envoys. Shots were fired and, as Jan Chryzostom Pasek later wrote in his diaries, “bishops and senators hid themselves under chairs, emerging only after the situation had been defused.”Two days later, on June 19, Wiśniowiecki was elected the new king. A Polish nobleman, Jan Antoni Chrapowicki, who participated in the free election, wrote later: “There were different factions: some wanted the Neuburgian, others supported the Lotharingian. Since neither side wanted to resign their candidacy, it was decided that in order to avoid commotion, a Piast will be elected, who turned out to be  Michał Korybut Wiśniowiecki. Primate Prazmowski, who was hesitant at the choice, was eventually forced to sing the Te Deum hymn”.

Even though Wisniowiecki won the support of the majority of electors, a faction led by Prazmowski and Sobieski continued to oppose him. The Crowning by the Sejm, which took place in Kraków, was dismissed. The Commonwealth, which suffered from continuous Crimean Tatar raids, was on the brink of civil war. Outbreak of the Polish–Ottoman War (1672–76) changed this situation, ending internal conflicts.

See also 
 History of Poland in the Early Modern era (1569–1795)
 Royal elections in Poland
 Golden Liberty
 Henrician Articles

References

Sources 
 U. Augustyniak, Historia Polski 1572–1795, Warszawa 2008
 M. Markiewicz, Historia Polski 1494–1795, Kraków 2002
Stone, D.Z. (2014) The Polish-Lithuanian state, 1386–1795

Royal elections in the Polish–Lithuanian Commonwealth
17th-century elections in Europe
1669 in politics
1669 in the Polish–Lithuanian Commonwealth
Non-partisan elections